padmasri Satyanarayana Rajguru (1903-1997) was an Indian litterateur, epigraphist and historian. He was a curator and epigraphist at the Odisha State Museum and was a recipient of Sahitya Akademi Award, Bharati Bhushan award, Ganjam Sahitya Sammilani award, Odisha Sahitya Academy Award and Sarala Sanman. The Government of India awarded him the fourth highest Indian civilian award of Padma Shri in 1974.

Biography
Born on 19 August 1903 to Harikrushna Rajguru and Sunamani Devi in the Indian state of Odisha, Rajguru passed the Oriya and Sanskrit title examination from Andhra University and started his career in 1929 as the manager of Parala Padmanabha Rangalaya, the first theatre in Odisha, founded by Padmanabha Narayan Deb, erstwhile Raja of the state of Parala. During his tenure there, he was associated with the activities of Utkal Sammilani and assisted Krushna Chandra Gajapati in the formation of Odisha state in 1937; he is known to have submitted a thesis on the state reorganization.

Rajguru, after his tenure as the president of the Ganjam District Education Council (1942–45), worked as an assistant at the Kalinga Historical Research Society at Bhawanipatna from 1947 and later, joined Odisha State Museum to work as a curator (1950–61) and later as an epigraphist (1963–70). He was a member of the working committee of Odisha Sahitya Academy and the chairman of Paralakhemundi Municipality. He was a life member of Berhampur University and was awarded DLitt by the university.

Rajguru is known to have done notable research on the history of Odisha and is credited with findings on the early of life of Jayadeva, the thirteenth century Sanskrit poet and the author of Gita Govinda. He translated The Palanquin Bearers, a poem by Sarojini Naidu into Odia language under the name, Palinki Bahaka and has published several other works, some of which are prescribed text for university studies.

 Mo Jeevana Sangrama (autobiography)
 Swapane Chumban
 Janani Utkal
 Radhavisek
 Odia Lipira Krama Bikash
 History of Gangas
 The Korasanda Copper Plate Grant of Visakhavarmma
 History of Eastern Gangas of Kalinga
 Heirographic Letters of Naraj
 The Odras and their Predominency
 The Historical Research in Orissa
 The Konduli Copper Plate Grant of Narasimha Deva of Saka 1305
 Sumandal Plates of Dharmaraj
 Ranpur plates of Dharmaraja
 Historical Background of Gopinath & Radha Krishna
 Oriya Inscription on a Stone Image
 South Indian Inscriptions

Satyanarayana Rajguru died on 11 June 1997 at the age of 93, his wife Taramani Devi preceding him in death by one year. He is survived by his sons Gopeshwar rajguru, Radha Raman rajguru and sitakant rajguru.

Honours, awards and recognition
Rajguru was awarded the civilian honour Padma Shri in 1974 by the Government of India. He received the Sahitya Akademi Award for his autobiography, Mo Jeevana Sangrama in 1996. He was also a recipient of Bharati Bhushan award from Andhra Mahasabha, Ganjam Sahitya Sammilani award (1968) and Odisha Sahitya Academy award (1968). A recipient of Sarala Sanman (1989) from Sarala Sansad,

References

Further reading
 
 

1903 births
1997 deaths
Recipients of the Padma Shri in literature & education
Recipients of the Sahitya Akademi Award in Odia
Poets from Odisha
20th-century Indian translators
Indian epigraphers
Museum people
20th-century Indian poets
20th-century Indian linguists
Andhra University alumni
Indian male poets
Scientists from Odisha
20th-century Indian male writers